This page is about auto makers in Taiwan.  This list does not include dealers or importing companies. This page only features vehicles and brands manufactured or assembled in Taiwan.

Hotai Motor
Hotai Motor, through its affiliate Kuozui Motors, manufactures Toyota vehicles in Taiwan.

Yulon Motors
In 2004, Yulon Motors created Yulon Nissan Motors, a subsidiary dedicated to building Nissan vehicles under license. However, Yulon's manufacturing division continued to manufacture cars for other automakers. On 22 November 2005, Yulon GM was established as a joint venture of Yulon and GM.

Currently, Yulon manufactures Nissan vehicles for Yulon Nissan Motors and their own all-terrain vehicle brand called Cectek.

Yulon Motors
Known as "Yue Loong" until 1992, Yulon Motors sells Nissan and Renault vehicles.

Vehicles currently manufactured by Yulon in Taiwan are the Nissan March, Nissan Verita (the modified version of the Nissan March), Nissan Sentra, Nissan Teana, Nissan Serena, and the Nissan X-Trail.

Luxgen
Luxgen produces cars under its own brand owned by Yulon. The models are Luxgen S5, Luxgen S3, Luxgen U5, Luxgen U6, Luxgen7 MPV and, Luxgen7 SUV. It imports Luxgen cars to China  Owned by Dongfeng using the name Dongfeng Yulon as a joint venture.

Yulon GM
Yulon GM sold Opel, Buick, and Cadillac vehicles, and produced the Buick Lacrosse and Buick Excelle. The cooperation between GM and Yulon ended in 2012.

China Motor Corporation
China Motor Corporation (CMC) manufactures Daimler Chrysler and Mitsubishi vehicles. CMC also sells Mitsubishi vehicles in Taiwan, and exports redesigned Mitsubishi vehicles.

CMC currently manufactures the Mitsubishi Lancer, Mitsubishi Grunder (Asia-Pacific version of Mitsubishi Galant, redesigned by CMC), Mitsubishi Savrin, Mitsubishi Space Gear, and the Mitsubishi Zinger, based upon the platform of Mitsubishi Challenger in Taiwan.

In 2006, CMC started manufacturing Chrysler vehicles for DaimlerChrysler Taiwan. The Town and Country was the first Chrysler vehicle to be assembled in Taiwan, and it is widely anticipated that the Caliber will be the next.

Chin Chun Motors
Chin Chun Motors manufactures Commercial Hyundai vehicles in Taiwan.

Chin Chun Motors formerly manufactures the Hyundai Porter and Hyundai Starex in Taiwan.

Kuozui Motors
Kuozui Motors manufactures Toyota vehicles in Taiwan, including the Toyota Vios, Toyota Altis, Toyota Camry, Toyota Wish, Toyota Zace, and Toyota Yaris.

Hotai Motors is in charge of selling the Toyota vehicles and provides after-sales service.

Ford Lio Ho
Ford Lio Ho manufactures Ford and Ford-badged vehicles in Taiwan.

Due to the global strategy of the Ford Motor Company between the mid-1980s and mid-1990s, Ford Lio Ho assembled vehicles based on the Mazda 323 and 626 series, known as the Explorer, Ford Laser and Telstar, in common with other Asia Pacific markets.

Since Ford bought Mazda in the 1970s, Ford Lio Ho also produces Mazda vehicles in Taiwan. For a while, the Suzuki Carry (a General Motors product) was sold as the "Ford Pronto" in Taiwan.

Current vehicles manufactured in Taiwan include Ford Activa, Ford Tierra, Ford Focus, Ford Mondeo, Ford Escape, Mazda Protege, Mazda 3, Mazda 5, and the Mazda Tribute.

Honda Taiwan
Honda Taiwan manufactures Honda vehicles in Taiwan.

Current vehicles manufactured in Taiwan: Honda Fit, Honda HR-V, and the Honda CR-V.

Her Chee
Her Chee Industrial manufactures small SUV side by side all-terrain vehicles and wide range of motorcycles, scooters and ATVs.

San Yang
San Yang manufactures Hyundai vehicles in Taiwan, including the Hyundai Verna,  Hyundai Getz, Hyundai Matrix, Hyundai Elantra, and Hyundai Tucson.

Formosa Automobile
Formosa Automobile manufactured Daewoo vehicles from 2003 until the end of 2006. About 29,500 cars were built in total. The Daewoo Magnus, also known as Chevrolet Epica or Evanda in global markets, was nicknamed the Formosa 1. The Daewoo Matiz, also known as Chevrolet Matiz or Spark in global markets, was nicknamed the Formosa 2.

Formosa Automobile started to sell imported Škoda vehicles in 2005, beginning with the Fabia.

Future vehicles to be manufactured in Taiwan include the Škoda Fabia in 2007, to be rebadged as a Formosa model.

Prince Motors
Prince Motors manufactured Suzuki vehicles in Taiwan, including the Suzuki Solio, Suzuki Swift, and Suzuki Grand Vitara.

Ta Ching Motor
Ta Ching Motor Co. assembled Subaru cars in Taiwan from 1989 to the early 2000s, and also developed a sedan version of the Subaru Justy which was unique to Taiwan.

References

 
Taiwan